"Et j'attends" is the second single from French singer Leslie's album, Mes Couleurs.

Track listing
"Et j'attends"
"Tous ces Gens"
"Sobri (notre destin)" [feat. Amine]

Charts

References

2005 songs
Leslie (singer) songs
Songs written by Leslie (singer)